Elms Bridge Halt was a request stop on the former Coleford, Monmouth, Usk and Pontypool Railway. It was opened on 27 November 1933 to serve the villages near Raglan, Monmouthshire. It was closed in 1955 following the withdrawal of passenger services on the line. It was located in a small cutting near a small road bridge about 5 miles and 56 chains from Monmouth Troy. The halt was of earth and cinder construction, typical of the Great Western Railway.

References

Disused railway stations in Monmouthshire
Former Great Western Railway stations
Railway stations in Great Britain opened in 1933
Railway stations in Great Britain closed in 1955